Monica McInerney is a best-selling Australian-born, Dublin-based writer. In 2014, 2016, 2018 and 2019 McInerney was voted into the top ten of Booktopia's 'Australia's Favourite Novelist' poll. Her 12th novel, The Trip of a Lifetime, was released in July 2017, and her books have been published in multiple countries and languages.

Life 
McInerney grew up in a family of seven children in the Clare Valley wine region of South Australia, where her father was the railway stationmaster and her mother worked in the local library. Since then Monica has lived in several Australian cities, and in Ireland and London.

A book publicist for ten years, McInerney has also worked on events such as the Dublin International Writers' Festival. She has previously worked as an event manager and organiser of tourism festivals, a freelance writer/editor, a record company press officer, a barmaid, grape picker and hotel cleaner; and in arts marketing, public relations and television production roles.

For more than 25 years, McInerney and her Irish husband have been moving back and forth between Australia and Ireland. They currently live in Dublin.

Fiction writing 
In her first novel, A Taste for It (2001), McInerney tracks the travels of an Australian chef, Maura Carmody, as she bungles her way around Ireland. The book established themes of romance, dislocation and adventure that McInerney would expand upon for years to come.

Between 2002 and 2005 McInerney produced four novels – Upside Down Inside Out (2002), Spin the Bottle (2003), Alphabet Sisters (2004) and Family Baggage (2005) – which also traversed themes of romance, travel and family dynamics, to increasingly positive reviews. In a 2004 review of Alphabet Sisters, The Age newspaper's Christopher Bantick wrote that McInerney's departure from romantic comedy allowed for a sharpened "exploration of contemporary women and their relationships." Of Family Baggage, Marie Claire magazine wrote: "With every book, Monica McInerney becomes more skilled at juggling plot complexities and giving depth to her characters…"

In 2006, McInerney was the main ambassador for the Australian Government's 'Books Alive' national reading campaign, for which she wrote a limited edition novella called Odd One Out. McInerney's sixth novel, Those Faraday Girls (2007), won General Fiction Book of the Year at the Australian Book Industry Awards. In a review of the book, Sydney's Sun Herald newspaper described McInerney as: "Australia’s answer to Maeve Binchy, a modern-day Jane Austen." More success followed that of Those Faraday Girls, with several of McInerney's subsequent novels being shortlisted for major writing awards in Australia and Ireland.

McInerney's 2008 collection of short stories, All Together Now, was shortlisted for General Fiction Book of the Year in the 2009 Australian Book Industry Awards. Hobart's Mercury newspaper described the collection as: "stories that will edify and bring a tear to the eye as well. Yes, this can be from laughter at McInerney’s sense of fun and playfulness, but also in the tender observations she makes of the frailty of love and life."

For her next novel, 2010's At Home with the Templetons, McInerney expanded on the exploration of family dynamics, broadening the scope of the interactions to those amongst two families. In an interview with Fancy Goods she explained: "What I wanted to do with this novel was bring two very different families – the seven unruly Templetons and the smaller unit of Nina Donovan and her son Tom – into each other’s orbit, with good and bad consequences. I also wanted to touch on issues such as jealousy in its many and damaging forms, the lasting impact of grief, the different aspects of motherhood and marriage, sibling rivalry and sibling loyalty, contrasting parenting styles, family secrets and lies, all against a background as rich in comedy and drama as possible." Her 2011 release, Lola's Secret – "A funny, sad and moving novel about memories and moments and the very meaning of life" – was shortlisted for the Australian Book Industry Awards, General Fiction Book of the Year in 2012 and is now available as a Pink Popular Penguin, raising funds to place breast-care nurses in rural Australia.

In 2012's The House of Memories, McInerney explores the reverberations of grief after the death of a child, calling on the despair she'd experienced at the loss of her own father. In an interview in 2012, McInerney explained: "Grief is the rawest of human emotions and it is different for everybody who goes through it. Once I opened myself to thinking about that, it seemed to be everywhere. I've been really bowled over by the emails I've been getting from readers; so many people have been through something like this."
McInerney published two short stories as an eBook titled The Christmas Gift in 2013 and released her 11th major work, Hello from the Gillespies, in October 2014, which is described as "A funny and heartfelt novel about miscommunication and mayhem in a family like no other." Hello from the Gillespies was included on Oprah Winfrey's "Three Books to Take on a Flight" list, as well as Booktopia's 2014 Books of the Year and Australia's Favourite Author polls, and the Huffington Post's 2015 Top 10 Novels to Read this Winter list.

In her 2017 novel, The Trip of a Lifetime, McInerney reacquaints readers with the Quinlan family, previously featured in The Alphabet Sisters and Lola's Secret. This time, the family's wilful and eccentric matriarch, Lola, takes her granddaughter and great-granddaughter to visit her Irish homeland. But as the journey unfolds, Lola must confront the reasons she left Ireland, and the real motivations for her return. The Trip of a Lifetime went straight to Number 1 in Australia in July 2017 and was a Top 10 bestseller in Ireland. It was shortlisted for the General Fiction Book of the Year in the 2018 Australian Book Industry Awards.

Published works 
 A Taste for It (2000)
 Upside Down Inside Out (2002)
 Spin the Bottle (2003)
 Alphabet Sisters (2004)
 Family Baggage (2005)
 Odd One Out (2006)
 Those Faraday Girls (2007)
 All Together Now (2008)
 At Home with the Templetons (2010)
 Lola's Secret 2011
 The House of Memories (2012)
 The Christmas Gift (eBook novella) (2013)
 Hello from the Gillespies (2014)
 The Trip of a Lifetime (2017)
 The Godmothers (2020)

Awards and nominations 
 2008 – Australian Book Industry Awards, General Fiction Book of the Year for Those Faraday Girls
 2009 – Shortlisted for the Australian Book Industry Awards, General Fiction Book of the Year for All Together Now 
 2010 – Shortlisted for the Irish Book Awards, Popular Fiction for At Home with the Templetons
 2011 – Shortlisted for the Romantic Book of the Year Award for  At Home with the Templetons
 2011 – Shortlisted for the Australian Book Industry Awards, General Fiction Book of the Year for At Home with the Templetons 
 2012 – Shortlisted for the Australian Book Industry Awards, General Fiction Book of the Year for Lola's Secret
 2018 – Shortlisted for the Australian Book Industry Awards, General Fiction Book of the Year for The Trip of a Lifetime.
2021 – Shortlisted for the Australian Book Industry Awards, General Fiction Book of the Year for The Godmothers

References

External links 
 Monica McInerney 
 Penguin Books Australia

Australian writers
Living people
Year of birth missing (living people)